Love and Sas were a Canadian R&B, funk and rap influenced pop group composed of singers Lovena Fox and Saskia Garel.  The pair released several singles which became Top 40 hits on Canadian pop charts and won two Juno awards.

History

Fox and Garel were brought together in 1991 by Richie Mayer and record producer David Bendeth, who at the time worked for BMG Canada. Fox, who had worked in musical theatre and as a back-up singer for Bon Jovi, The Payolas, and Colin James, became the lead singer. Garel was born in Kingston, Jamaica, and moved to Toronto at the age of six. A winner of the Oscar Peterson Award, she had jazz and classical voice training at Claude Watson School of the Arts, The Royal Conservatory of Music and York University.

The two, compared by Jam! Showbiz to American female rappers Salt-N-Pepa, released their first album Call My Name in 1991

The album  spawned the singles "I Don't Need Yo' Kiss" and "Call My Name". "Don't Stop Now" and "Once in a Lifetime". Sas's rap in "I Don't Need Yo' Kiss" was one of the first Canadian female rap performances.

A second album, Once in a Lifetime, was released in 1992. The two albums each won a Juno award for 'Best R&B Recording'.

The duo toured Canada, U.S., and the UK, but disbanded in the summer of 1993.

Discography

Albums 
 1991: Call My Name (BMG)
 1992: Once In A Lifetime (BMG)

Filmography

Music videos

Awards and nominations

|-
| rowspan="3"| 1992
| "Call My Name" || Juno Awards Best R&B/Soul Recording || 
|-
| "I Don't Need Yo Kiss" || Juno Awards Best Dance Recording || 
|-
| "Don't Stop Now" || Muchmusic Awards Best Dance Video  || 
|-
| 1993 || "Once In A Lifetime" || Juno Awards Best R&B/Soul Recording || 
|-

References

External links
 Canadian Pop Encyclopedia

Black Canadian musical groups
Canadian pop music groups
Canadian contemporary R&B musical groups
Canadian dance music groups
Canadian girl groups
Juno Award for R&B/Soul Recording of the Year winners
Musical groups from Toronto
Female musical duos